The palatal lateral ejective affricate is a rare type of consonantal sound, used in some spoken languages.

It is a rare sound, found in Dahalo, a Cushitic language of Kenya, and in Hadza, a language isolate of Tanzania.

Features
Features of the palatal lateral ejective affricate:

Occurrence

Notes

References

 
 

Affricates
Lateral consonants
Palatal consonants
Ejectives
Oral consonants